In particle physics, hypercolor is a hypothetical attractive force that binds prequarks together by the exchange of hypergluons, analogous to the exchange of gluons by the color force, which binds quarks together.

See also 
 Technicolor (physics)

References 

Quantum chromodynamics